Alfons X is a Barcelona metro station, located under Ronda Guinardó and Plaça d'Alfons el Savi, named after Alfonso X of Castile, in the Horta-Guinardó district of Barcelona.

It has three entrances, one on the square itself, a second one next to Parc de les Aigües and another one on Carrer Lepant. As of 2007 it is the only metro service in the surrounding area (Can Baró), and will be until Sanllehy metro station on L9 and L10 is complete.

Services

External links

Trenscat.com (with photos)

Railway stations in Spain opened in 1974
Transport in Horta-Guinardó
Barcelona Metro line 4 stations